Grant Connell (Pronounced: KAHN-nell) (born November 17, 1965) is a former professional tennis player from Canada, and has been a real estate agent for the past 14 years in Vancouver. He specializes in West Vancouver North Vancouver and Downtown properties real estate transactions. He is considered one of the world's top doubles player from the early to late -1990s, reaching the world No. 1 doubles ranking in November 1993.

Connell won 22 doubles titles during his eleven seasons on the ATP Tour (1986 to 1997). He won his first four with fellow Canadian Glenn Michibata. Upon Michibata's retirement from the tour, Connell joined Patrick Galbraith. The Connell-Galbraith tandem won 12 titles together, including the 1995 season ending Doubles Championships tournament. Connell's next main partner became Byron Black with whom he won four more titles. He also won a title each with Todd Martin and Scott Davis. He was a three-time Wimbledon doubles finalist, twice with Galbraith and once with Black.

A left-hander, Connell best singles ranking was world No. 67, which he reached in June 1991. His best tour singles results were reaching the semifinals of the 1991 Chicago, 1991 Singapore, and 1992 Auckland Grand Prix events.

Connell's best Grand Slam singles results were reaching the third round of the 1991 Australian Open and 1994 Wimbledon.

A solid grass-court player, Connell had Andre Agassi on the ropes in their first round encounter at Wimbledon in 1991. In that match, Connell served a gutsy second serve ace to win the third set tie-breaker and go up two sets to one. Agassi however won the final two sets 7–5, 6–3, to take the match. (The following year at Wimbledon saw Agassi win his first Grand Slam event.)
As well, Connell reached five mixed semifinals at Wimbledon. The majority of those with his highly ranked partner Lindsay Davenport. Reporters have noted that neither one of them seemed too concerned about winning any title but had a lot of fun losing.

Connell played Davis Cup for Canada on numerous occasions posting a career 15–6 win–loss record in doubles and an equally impressive 8–3 record in singles. He was a member of Canada's 1991 and 1992 Davis Cup teams winning all three needed matches in each of those wins to put Canada in to the World Group for its first two times in canadian tennis history. 
Awards: Winner of the “Spirit of Sport” national award for the athlete who gives back the most to charity and their sport; 
Member of the Canadian Tennis Hall of Fame, Canadian Open Hall of Fame, BC Sports Hall of Fame, Texas A&M University Hall of Fame, and B.C. Summer Swimming Hall of Fame.

As a college player
Growing up in North Vancouver, Connell was an All-American in doubles in 1984 and in singles in 1985 at Texas A&M University.  Ranked No. 5 in singles in NCAA‘s and undefeated in the SWC in singles play in ‘85 that same year before turning pro, he lost in the quarterfinals of the NCAA individual tennis championships to fellow future touring pro Mikael Pernfors.

As a touring pro

1984, 1985
While still an amateur, Connell played the Player's International twice as a wild card entry, losing in the first round of the main draw each time. In 1984 he lost to world No. 17, Joakim Nyström, 4–6, 3–6, while the following summer Connell fell to world No. 47, 6–7, 3–6.

On December 30, 1985, Connell was ranked by the ATP No. 570T in singles and No. 724T in doubles.

1986
Connell played the San Luis Potosí Challenger in March, reaching the second round in both singles and doubles. He defeated world No. 327, Evan Ratner, 6–1, 6–4, before losing to world No. 415, Karl Richter, 6–3, 6–7, 3–6, while in doubles, he and partner Mark Greenan, also Canadian, lost their second round match to Mark Wooldridge and Derek Tarr in a third set tie-break.

In July, Connell played two further Challengers. At the Schenectady Challenger, he and Greenan lost in the first round in doubles. At the Berkeley Challenger the following week, Connell and Greenan again lost in the first round, while in singles Connell reached the semifinals, defeating Charles Buzz Strode, Russell Simpson, and Paul Chamberlin all in straight sets before falling to Mike Bauer, 6–7, 2–6.

In August, Connell again played the Player's, but in doubles this time, again partnering Greenan. The pair lost, however, in the first round, to the pair of Ricardo Acuña and Bob Green, 6–1, 3–6, 4–6. Connell next saw action in three European Challengers in November. At the Helsinki Challenger, he lost in both singles and doubles in the first round. The following week at Bergen Challenger, he reached the second round of both, falling to Dan Goldie in three sets in singles and partnering Chamberlin in doubles. Connell finished 1986 on tour with a bang, reaching the semifinals at the Valkenswaard Challenger in both singles and doubles, again partnering Chamberlin.

On December 29, 1986, Connell was ranked world No. 191 in singles and No. 217 in doubles.

1987
Connell began 1987 playing in his first Grand Slam event, the Australian Open. He lost in singles in the first round, in straight sets, to world No. 116 Todd Nelson. In doubles, he and partner American Chris Kennedy reached the second round.

Connell's next main draw action was in March, at the Cherbourg Challenger.

1988
Connell began the year at the AAMI Classic in Sydney, Australia where he lost in the first round to Pete Sampras, 4–6, 7–5, 4–6.

1989–1994

Career finals

Doubles (22 titles)

Doubles performance timeline

Honours
Connell was inducted into the Canadian Tennis Hall of Fame in 1998.

After retiring as a tennis pro
Upon retiring from the tour in 1997, Connell became High Performance Director at Tennis BC as well as Davis Cup Captain. As captain he led the team to the World Group for only the third time. He was also the Tournament Director for Rogers Cup in Toronto in 2006  As of the last 14 years Grant has been selling real estate in Vancouver, BC.

References

External links
 
 
 

Canadian expatriate sportspeople in the United States
Canadian male tennis players
Canadian tennis coaches 
Olympic tennis players of Canada
Sportspeople from Vancouver
Sportspeople from Regina, Saskatchewan
Racket sportspeople from British Columbia
Racket sportspeople from Saskatchewan
Tennis players at the 1988 Summer Olympics
Tennis players at the 1996 Summer Olympics
Texas A&M Aggies men's tennis players
1965 births
Living people
ATP number 1 ranked doubles tennis players